Aboudeïa is one of three departments in Salamat, a region of Chad. Its capital is Aboudeïa.

Departments of Chad
Salamat Region